Haram Township is a civil township in Bottineau County in the U.S. state of North Dakota. As of the 2000 census, its population was 85.

History
Haram Township was organized in 1910 from Mountain View School Township in 1910. The 1910 Census recorded a population of 424 in the township.

Early Norwegian settlers in the area named the township after Haram, Norway.

Schools
Mountain View School No. 2
Mountain View School No. 3

Geography
Haram Township is located in survey townships 163N and 164N, Range 77W. Township 164N, Range 77W is a fractional township containing less than the standard 36 sections of land, due its location along the U.S. border with Canada.

Natural features
Boundary Creek
Turtle Mountains

Cities and populated places
Souris

References

Townships in Bottineau County, North Dakota
Populated places established in 1910
Townships in North Dakota